Thomas Kyd (baptised 6 November 1558; buried 15 August 1594) was an English playwright, the author of The Spanish Tragedy, and one of the most important figures in the development of Elizabethan drama.

Although well known in his own time, Kyd fell into obscurity until 1773 when Thomas Hawkins, an early editor of The Spanish Tragedy, discovered that Kyd was named as its author by Thomas Heywood in his Apologie for Actors (1612). A hundred years later, scholars in Germany and England began to shed light on his life and work, including the controversial finding that he may have been the author of a Hamlet play pre-dating Shakespeare's, which is now known as the Ur-Hamlet.

Early life
Thomas Kyd was the son of Francis and Anna Kyd. There are no records of the day he was born, but he was baptised in the church of St Mary Woolnoth in the Ward of Langborn, Lombard Street, London on 6 November 1558. The baptismal register at St Mary Woolnoth carries this entry: "Thomas, son of Francis Kydd, Citizen and Writer of the Courte Letter of London". Francis Kydd was a scrivener and in 1580 was warden of the Scriveners' Company.

In October 1565 the young Kyd was enrolled in the newly founded Merchant Taylors' School, whose headmaster was Richard Mulcaster. Fellow students included Edmund Spenser and Thomas Lodge. Here, Kyd received a well-rounded education, thanks to Mulcaster's progressive ideas. Apart from Latin and Greek, the curriculum included music, drama, physical education, and "good manners". There is no evidence that Kyd went on to university. He may have followed in his father's professional footsteps because there are two letters written by him and his writing style is similar to that of a scrivener.

Career

Evidence suggests that in the 1580s Kyd became an important playwright, but little is known about his activity. Francis Meres placed him among "our best for tragedy" and Heywood elsewhere called him "Famous Kyd". Ben Jonson mentions him in the same breath as Christopher Marlowe (with whom, in London, Kyd at one time shared a room) and John Lyly in the Shakespeare First Folio.

The Spanish Tragedy was probably written in the mid to late 1580s. The earliest surviving edition was printed in 1592; the full title being, The Spanish Tragedie, Containing the lamentable end of Don Horatio, and Bel-imperia: with the pittifull death of olde Hieronimo. However, the play was usually known simply as "Hieronimo", after the protagonist. It was arguably the most popular play of the "Age of Shakespeare" and set new standards in effective plot construction and character development. In 1602 a version of the play with "additions" was published. Philip Henslowe's diary records payment to Ben Jonson for additions that year, but it is disputed whether the published additions reflect Jonson's work or if they were actually composed for a 1597 revival of The Spanish Tragedy also mentioned by Henslowe.

Other works by Kyd are his translations of Torquato Tasso's Padre di Famiglia, published as The Householder's Philosophy (1588); and Robert Garnier's Cornélie (1594). Plays attributed in whole or in part to Kyd include Soliman and Perseda, King Leir, Fair Em, Arden of Faversham  and parts of Henry VI Part One and Edward III. A play related to The Spanish Tragedy called The First Part of Hieronimo (surviving in a quarto of 1605) may be a bad quarto or memorial reconstruction of a play by Kyd, or it may be an inferior writer's burlesque of The Spanish Tragedy inspired by that play's popularity. Kyd is supposed by some to have been the author of a Hamlet, the precursor of the Shakespearean play (see: Ur-Hamlet).

The success of Kyd's plays extended to Europe. Versions of The Spanish Tragedy were popular in Germany and the Netherlands for generations. The influence of these plays on European drama was largely the reason for the interest in Kyd among German scholars in the nineteenth century.

Later life
From 1587 to 1593 Kyd was in the service of an unidentified noble, since, after his imprisonment in 1593 (see below), he wrote of having lost "the favours of my Lord, whom I haue servd almost theis vi yeres nowe". Proposed nobles include the Earl of Sussex, the Earl of Pembroke, Lord Strange. and Edward De Vere, 17th Earl of Oxford. He may have worked as a secretary, if he did not also write plays. Around 1591 Christopher Marlowe also joined this patron's service, and for a while Marlowe and Kyd shared lodgings, and perhaps even ideas.

On 11 May 1593 the Privy Council ordered the arrest of the authors of "divers lewd and mutinous libels" which had been posted around London. The next day, Kyd was among those arrested; he would later believe that he had been the victim of an informer. His lodgings were searched and instead of evidence of the "libels" there was found an Arianist tract, described by an investigator as "vile heretical conceits denying the eternal deity of Jesus Christ found amongst the papers of Thos. Kydd (sic), prisoner ... which he affirmeth he had from C. Marley (sic)". It is believed that Kyd was tortured brutally to obtain this information. Kyd told authorities the writings found in his possession belonged to Christopher Marlowe, a fellow dramatist and former roommate. Kyd “accused his former roommate of being a blasphemous traitor, an atheist who believed that Jesus Christ was a homosexual,” an uninformed confusion over the Arian and Early Gnostic concept of homoousios. Unfortunately, Kyd was with Marlowe at the wrong place at the wrong time. Marlowe was summoned by the Privy Council after these events, and, while waiting for a decision on his case, was killed in an incident in Deptford involving known government agents.

Kyd was eventually released but was not accepted back into his lord's service. Believing he was under suspicion of atheism himself, he wrote to the Lord Keeper, Sir John Puckering, protesting his innocence, but his efforts to clear his name were apparently fruitless. The last we hear from the playwright is the publication of Cornelia early in 1594. In the dedication to the Countess of Sussex he alludes to the "bitter times and privy broken passions" he had endured. Kyd died later that year at the age of 35, and was buried on 15 August in St Mary Colechurch in London. In December of that same year, Kyd's mother legally renounced the administration of his estate, probably because it was debt-ridden.

St Mary Colechurch was destroyed in the Great Fire of London in 1666, and not rebuilt. Thus Thomas Kyd's grave was lost to posterity.

Works
The dates of composition are approximate.

 Don Horatio (partially extant in The First Part of Hieronimo, c. 1586)
 The Spanish Tragedy (c. 1587)
 The Householder's Philosophy (translation, 1588)
 The Murder of John Brewen (pamphlet, 1592)
 Fair Em (attributed, c. 1590)
 Arden of Faversham (attributed, 1592)
 Solyman and Perseda (attributed, c. 1593)
 Cornelia (translation of Robert Garnier, 1594)
 King Leir (attributed, 1594)

References

Bibliography
Philip Edwards, The Spanish Tragedy, Methuen, 1959, reprinted 1974. .
Charles Nicholl, The Reckoning: The Murder of Christopher Marlowe, Vintage, 2002 (revised edition).  (especially for the circumstances surrounding Kyd's arrest).

External links

 Thomas Kyd at the Lumniarum website
 
 
 
 
  (University of West Alabama)
 Perverse justice in Kyd's Spanish Tragedy, by John Nettles (University of Georgia)

1558 births
1594 deaths
English Renaissance dramatists
People educated at Merchant Taylors' School, Northwood
16th-century English writers
16th-century male writers
16th-century English dramatists and playwrights
English male dramatists and playwrights
University Wits